Zygaena zuleima   is a species of moth in the Zygaenidae family. It is found in the Atlas Mountains (in Morocco, Algeria, and Tunisia).

In Seitz (1913):
Z. zuleima Pier. (=ludicra Luc) (4d). A small, delicate insect with an almost naked body. The wedge-spots are narrow, being separated by broad black interspaces; the external streak angulate, hooklike, being extended close to distal margin. — In Algiers, on meadows, in spring till early .May not rarely on Umbelliferae, for instance near Oran, on the parade-grounds of Constantine, etc.

References

Zygaena
Moths described in 1837